During the 1996–97 English football season, Oldham Athletic A.F.C. competed in the Football League First Division.

Season summary
The 1996–97 season was a major struggle for Oldham which resulted in Graeme Sharp resigning in February. Sharp was succeeded by Neil Warnock, who had previously achieved promotion success with Scarborough, Notts County (twice), Huddersfield Town and Plymouth Argyle but was unable to save Oldham from relegation to the third tier for the first time in 23 years which was confirmed three months later following Bradford City's win against Charlton Athletic.

Final league table

Results
Oldham Athletic's score comes first

Legend

Football League First Division

FA Cup

League Cup

First-team squad

References

Notes

Oldham Athletic A.F.C. seasons
Oldham Athletic